ZAMAK (or Zamac, formerly trademarked as MAZAK) is a family of alloys with a base metal of zinc and alloying elements of aluminium, magnesium, and copper.

Zamak alloys are part of the zinc aluminium alloy family; they are distinguished from the other ZA alloys because of their constant 4% aluminium composition.

The New Jersey Zinc Company developed zamak alloys in 1929.

The most common zamak alloy is zamak 3. Besides that, zamak 2, zamak 5 and zamak 7 are also commercially used. These alloys are most commonly die cast. Zamak alloys (particularly #3 and #5) are frequently used in the spin casting industry.

A large problem with early zinc die casting materials was zinc pest, owing to impurities in the alloys. Zamak avoided this by the use of 99.99% pure zinc metal, produced by New Jersey Zinc's use of a refluxer as part of the refining process.

Zamak can be electroplated, wet painted, and chromate conversion coated well.

Mazak
In the early 1930s Morris Ashby in Britain had licensed the New Jersey zamak alloy. The 99.99%-purity refluxer zinc was not available in Britain and so they acquired the right to manufacture the alloy using a locally available electrolytically refined zinc of 99.95% purity. This was given the name Mazak, partly to distinguish it from zamak and partly from the initials of Morris Ashby. In 1933, National Smelting licensed the refluxer patent with the intent of using it to produce 99.99% zinc in their plant at Avonmouth.
It is colloquially known among UK car restoration hobbyists as monkey metal.

Standards
Zinc alloy chemical composition standards are defined per country by the standard listed below:

Zamak goes by many different names based on standard and/or country:

The Short European Designation code breaks down as follows (using ZL0430 as the example):
 Z is the material (Z=Zinc)
 P is the use (P=Pressure die casting (casting), L=Ingot)
 04 is the percent aluminum (04= 4% aluminum)
 3 is the percent copper (3= 3% copper)

Zamak 2
Zamak 2 has the same composition as zamak 3 with the addition of 3% copper in order to increase strength by 20%, which also increases the price. Zamak 2 has the greatest strength out of all the zamak alloys. Over time it retains its strength and hardness better than the other alloys; however, it becomes more brittle, shrinks, and is less elastic.

Zamak 2 is also known as Kirksite when gravity cast for use as a die. It was originally designed for low volume sheet metal dies. It later gained popularity for making short run injection molding dies. It is also less commonly used for non-sparking tools and mandrels for metal spinning.

KS
The KS alloy was developed for spin casting decorative parts. It has the same composition as zamak 2, except with more magnesium in order to produce finer grains and reduce the orange peel effect.

Zamak 3
Zamak 3 is the de facto standard for the zamak series of zinc alloys; all other zinc alloys are compared to this. Zamak 3 has the base composition for the zamak alloys (96% zinc, 4% aluminum). It has excellent castability and long term dimensional stability. More than 70% of all North American zinc die castings are made from zamak 3.

Zamak 4

Zamak 4 was developed for the Asian markets to reduce the effects of die soldering while maintaining the ductility of zamak 3. This was achieved by using half the amount of copper from the zamak 5 composition.

Zamak 5
Zamak 5 has the same composition as zamak 3 with the addition of 1% copper in order to increase strength (by approximately 10%), hardness and corrosive resistance, but reduces ductility. It also has less dimensional accuracy. Zamak 5 is more commonly used in Europe.

Zamak 7

Zamak 7 has less magnesium than zamak 3 to increase fluidity and ductility, which is especially useful when casting thin wall components. In order to reduce inter-granular corrosion a small amount of nickel is added and impurities are more strictly controlled.

Uses
Common uses for zamak alloys include appliances, bathroom fixtures, die cast toys and automotive industry. Zamak alloys are also used in the manufacture of some firearms such as Glock, Hi-Point Firearms handguns and carbines.

See also
 Pot metal
 Babbitt (alloy)
 Zinc aluminium
 Zinc pest

References

External links
Generic Terms For Zinc Alloys
Zinc Die Casting Alloy Guide

Zinc alloys